is a mountain in Knoydart, in the Northwest Highlands of Scotland. It lies on the edge of Knoydart in an area known as the Rough Bounds of Knoydart.

The peak has a distinctive nipple-like summit, making it easily recognisable in views from many of Scotland's mountains, including Càrn Eige and Ben Nevis. Its close neighbours include Ladhar Bheinn and The Saddle, but thanks to the deep gulf separating it from them, it has a high prominence — the 25th highest in Britain.

Sgùrr na Cìche may be climbed from the head of Loch Nevis on the southern side of Knoydart by following the ridge of Druim a' Ghoirtein. However, due to the remoteness of the Knoydart peninsula, it is more commonly climbed as part of a circuit from the head of Glen Dessarry, via a route that also takes in the neighbouring Munros of Garbh Chioch Mhòr and Sgùrr nan Coireachan.

References
 Translation and pronunciation information come from this page
 This list gives information about map, grid ref and neighbours
 The Munros: Scottish Mountaineering Club Hillwalkers Guide, by Donald J. Bennet.

Citations

External links

Computer generated digital panoramas Sgùrr na Cìche Index

Munros
Marilyns of Scotland
Mountains and hills of the Northwest Highlands
One-thousanders of Scotland